CJM Racing was a NASCAR Nationwide Series team. It fielded the No. 11 car for a variety of drivers.

Sprint Cup Series
Businessmen Bryan and Tony Mullet formed Victory Motorsports in 2006 when they purchased the Sprint Cup equipment of Faith Motorsports from Morgan Shepherd.  After failing to make the field for each of the early attempts, Shepherd and the team went their separate ways and the team changed its name to CJM Racing. Kertus Davis and David Gilliland, and Brent Sherman took over the newly renumbered Dutch Quality Stone No. 72 car. Mike Skinner drove the car for two races that season.

Car No. 72 results

Nationwide Series
The team announced that Brandon Whitt would be the team's Cup driver for 2007, but after three races, it switched to the Busch Series and the No. 11. Jason Keller served as the team's driver and Force Protection Inc. and vehicle history company Carfax signed as sponsors.  Keller was moderately successful in the No. 11, with four of his five top 10 finishes for 2007 coming in that car. Keller also made his historic 418th start in the No. 11, beating the record set by Tommy Houston.

CJM started 2008 unsponsored, but negotiated a one race contract for Las Vegas with America's Incredible Pizza Company, which turned into a race by race sponsorship and eventually a season long sponsorship. Desiring new direction, the team released Keller after the fall Richmond race, heading to Baker Curb Racing. The team signed former Chip Gannasi Racing driver, Scott Lagasse Jr. for the rest of 2008 and 2009. 

The team switched to Toyota with support from Joe Gibbs Racing for 2009. After the U.S. Cellular 250, it released Lagasse and replaced him with Trevor Bayne, Kelly Bires, Mike Bliss, Denny Hamlin, Andrew Ranger, and Brian Scott. With the driver's release, America's Incredible Pizza left as well, leaving Ridemakerz and FedEx to assume sponsorship. The team also fielded the  No. 14 Lofton Cattle Toyota to Justin Lofton in the Carfax 200, starting 19th and finishing 16th in Lofton's series debut.

Suspending operations

December 18, 2009, the team announced that it would suspend operations for 2010.

References

External links 
CJM Racing

American auto racing teams
Companies based in North Carolina
Defunct NASCAR teams
Auto racing teams established in 2001
Auto racing teams disestablished in 2009